Ortenberg may refer to several places in Germany:

Ortenberg, Hesse
Ortenberg, Baden-Württemberg
Ortenberg Castle, near Ortenberg, Baden-Württemberg
Ortenberg (mountain), Baden-Württemberg